This is a list of WireTap episodes by season.  The current week's episode can be listened to on the live CBC Radio internet streams at several times on the broadcast day due to the multiple time zones the CBC services. At the beginning of Season 6, WireTap was made available for weekly download as a podcast and past seasons are available for purchase on iTunes.

:
Season 1
– Season 2
– Season 3
– Season 4
– Season 5
– Season 6
– Season 7
– Season 8
– Season 9
– Season 10
– Season 11

Season 1 
2004-07-03	It's Over
2004-07-10	Positive Thinking
2004-07-17	Tell It Like It Is
2004-07-24	Obsessions
2004-07-31	Diaries
2004-08-07	The First Thing That Comes to Mind
2004-08-14	Broken Telephone
2004-08-21	Messiah '83
2004-08-28	The Watcher
2004-09-04	What's Past is Past
2004-09-18	Canadian Content
2004-09-25	Let's Pretend
2004-10-02	Bullies
2004-10-09	Modern Language
2004-10-23	Our Fathers
2004-10-30	Halloween Special
2004-11-06	Old Scores
2004-11-20	Generation Gap
2004-11-27	There's No Business
2004-12-11	Of Man and Beast
2004-12-18	On the Beach
2005-02-12	The Call-in Show
2005-02-19	How I Became so Hostile
2005-03-05	Do Your Little Radio Show
2005-03-12	Movin' On
2005-03-19	The Wind at the End of the World
2005-04-02	Haters
2005-04-09	Vacation
2005-04-16	Confessions
2005-04-30	What I've Learned
2005-05-07	Prized Possessions
2005-05-14	Solving Quebec's Problems
2005-05-28	Life Lessons
2005-06-04	Reach For the Top
2005-06-11	The Big Shot

Season 2 
2005-09-18     The Believers
2005-09-25     Come on Get Happy
2005-10-02     Seduction
2005-10-09     Do It Yourself Fun Time
2005-10-16     Object of Affection
2005-10-23 	Get With It
2005-11-06	Performance 
2005-11-13	The Art of Charity
2005-11-20	One of a Kind
2005-12-04	We are Not Supermen
2005-12-11	New Technologies
2005-12-18	Compassion
2006-01-15	I Can See You Through the Radio
2006-01-22	Childhood's Promise
2006-01-29	A Listening Ear
2006-02-12	A World of Possibility
2006-02-19	The Bat and the Weasels
2006-02-26	Who Is the Mud Dog?
2006-03-12	The Measure of a Man
2006-03-19	Career Opportunities
2006-03-26	Forsaken
2006-04-16	Samson and Delilah
2006-04-23	Gentleman's Guide to Grooming
2006-05-07	Mr. Helpful
2006-05-14	The Lothario
2006-05-21	A Bottle of Seltzer
2006-06-04	Goody Two Shoes
2006-06-10	This One's For the Children
2006-06-25	10,000 Kilograms of Radio - The Best of Season 2

Season 3 
2006-09-10	Carpe Diem
2006-09-17	Love Is Just Around the Corner
2006-09-24	Family Album
2006-10-08	Man Versus Himself
2006-10-15	Selling Out
2006-10-22	Emergency Measures
2006-11-05	Noah's Ark
2006-11-12	Utopia
2006-11-19	A Secret History of Famous Friends
2006-12-10	A Fresh New Voice
2006-12-17	Morty and God
2007-01-14	Don't Go Changing
2007-01-21	Behind the Curtain
2007-01-28	Soul mate
2007-02-11	Just Relax
2007-02-18	Listen to Your Heart
2007-02-25	As Seen on TV
2007-03-11	Treat Me Right
2007-03-18	Everyday Magic
2007-03-25	Modern Times
2007-04-08	Love Thy Neighbour
2007-04-15	The Monkey, the Leopard and the Kitten
2007-04-22	A Dream of Life
2007-05-06	My Weekend in Dragon's Throat
2007-05-12      Brief Interviews with Confused Men - The Best of Season 3

Season 4 
2007-09-09 A Catalogue of Previous Universes
2007-09-16 Picasso Goldstein
2007-09-23 Far-Away Places
2007-10-07 How to be Funny
2007-10-14 Protect Yourself
2007-10-21 Mending the Past
2007-11-04 Fortune's Fool
2007-11-18 The Tortoise and the Bunny
2007-11-25 The New Josh
2007-12-02 The Wolf Boy, the Monkey Boy, and the Daddy's Boy
2007-12-16 Time to Face The World
2007-12-23 The Two Marys
2008-01-13 David and Goliath
2008-01-20 Helping Johnny
2008-01-27 Do Me a Solid
2008-02-10 Negative Scanning
2008-02-17 Fake It Until You Make It
2008-02-24 King David Part Two: David and Bathsheba
2008-03-09 Heaven and Hell
2008-03-16 Help Me, Doctor
2008-03-23 Private Life, Public Performance
2008-04-06 Life and Afterlife
2008-04-13 Man is the Rope Between the Ordinary and the Extraordinary
2008-04-20 Golden Calves and Sacred Cows
2008-05-04 The Quick Fix
2008-05-11 Songs of Sorrow
2008-05-18 Klosterman's Questions
2008-05-25 The Lives of Bugs and Men: The Best of Season 4

Season 5 
2008-09-07 Life is Lovely
2008-09-14 Where Did All the Spaniards Go?
2008-09-21 I Can’t Find the Books
2008-10-05 Where Do Babies Come From and Where Do Babies Go?
2008-10-12 The Fox and the Hedgehog
2008-10-19 The Hangover
2008-11-02 Who Wants to Live Forever
2008-11-09 Human Nature
2008-11-16 Make Your Own Fortune
2008-11-30 Into America
2008-12-07 Rainy Day Blues
2008-12-14 Meet the new Boss
2008-12-28 The Holiday Special
2009-01-11 The Dinner Party
2009-01-18 How To Say Goodbye
2009-01-25 Half Baked
2009-02-08 Of Time, Space and Money
2009-02-15 Lew Wasserman
2009-02-22 How To Build a Bomb Shelter
2009-03-08 Never Say I Love You
2009-03-15 100 False Messiahs
2009-03-22 Fishin' for Glory
2009-04-05 The Armchair Guide to Survival
2009-04-19 How to Be a Grownup
2009-04-26 Adam and Eve
2009-05-03 Why We Mistakes
2009-05-17 The Deciders
2009-05-24 Splendours of the Small Screen
2009-05-31 Buzz Pick Up The Phone: The Best of Season 5

Season 6 
2009-09-12 A Better You
2009-09-19 All Beasts Go to Heaven
2009-09-26 We Are But The Stuff Of Dreams
2009-10-10 The High Cost of Living
2009-10-17 Patent Pending
2009-10-24 High Art, Low Art
2009-11-07 No Man is an Island
2009-11-14 26 Minutes, 30 Seconds
2009-11-21 The Answering Machine
2009-12-05 Adhesion
2009-12-12 Jacob And Esau
2009-12-19 Mysteries
2010-01-16 Getting Away from it All
2010-01-23 Radical Honesty
2010-01-30 Multi Media
2010-02-13 A Matter of Taste
2010-02-27 Cain and Abel
2010-03-06 My Impostor
2010-03-13 Visiting Hours
2010-03-27 Bernice Meadows
2010-04-03 The Reverse Life
2010-04-10 Jonah and the Great Fish
2010-04-24 The World on a String
2010-05-01 The Price of Fame
2010-05-08 The Little One
2010-05-22 The Ride of Your Life
2010-05-29 There's No Ship Like Friendship: The Best of Season 6

Season 7 
2010-09-11 Chasing Rainbows
2010-09-18 Don't Make a Scene
2010-09-25 Negatron
2010-10-09 Live in the Now... NOW!
2010-10-16 Pick a Path
2010-10-30 Halloween 2010: To Sleep Perchance to Die
2010-11-06 The Mighty Boosh
2010-11-13 Making Ends Meet
2010-11-20 Modern Day Saviours
2010-12-04 Circle of Friends
2010-12-11 Life Out of Balance
2011-01-08 The Advice Show
2011-01-15 Special Features
2011-01-22 The Predicament
2011-01-29 The Grudge
2011-02-12 Couples
2011-02-19 It's Time
2011-02-26 We Be Illin'
2011-03-12 The Elite
2011-03-26 When Life Gives You Lemons
2011-04-08 A Change of Plan
2011-04-14 The Honeymooners
2011-04-22 The Pitch
2011-05-05 'Til Death Do Us Part
2011-05-13 By the Book
2011-05-20 The Big Thrill
2011-05-26 Party Like It's Monday: The Best of Season 7

Season 8 
2011-09-09 By the Seashore
2011-09-16 The God Whistle
2011-09-23 All Lies Great and Small
2011-10-07 The World Upside Down
2011-10-13 Spoiler Alert
2011-10-21 Look At Me, Don't Look At Me
2011-11-04 Private Eye
2011-11-11 Girls Gone Wild
2011-11-18 The Final Frontier
2011-12-02 Tales of Excess
2011-12-09 Gluttony
2011-12-16 Real Life Superheroes
2012-01-13 All the World's a Stage
2012-01-20 Man vs. Machine
2012-01-27 Wrath
2012-02-10 Lust
2012-02-17 Envy
2012-02-24 World Wide What
2012-03-02 Party Men
2012-03-09 Pride
2012-03-16 Sloth
2012-03-23 Welcome to the Family
2012-04-06 Best Perfect Day Ever
2012-04-13 Learn Some Manners
2012-04-20 Greed
2012-05-04 Hell is Other People
2012-05-11 A Whole Stack of Memories Never Equals One Little Hope
2012-05-18 Games of Chance
2012-05-25 Pessimistic Panthers: The Best of Season 8

Season 9 
2012-09-06 The Age of Love
2012-09-13 Nothing to Fear
2012-09-20 Animal Instinct
2012-10-04 The Nagging Task
2012-10-11 Letting Go
2012-10-25 Halloween 2012: Murder on the Wiretap Express
2012-11-08 Wake Up, Call Me, Tell Me Your Dream
2012-11-15 Why Travel: A Journey to Bali
2012-11-22 Know Your Strengths
2012-12-06 Look Ma, I'm Trending
2012-12-12 Co-ed
2012-12-20 A WireTap Christmas Carol
2013-01-17 Breaking the Rules
2013-01-24 Family Gathering
2013-02-08 Modern Love
2013-02-15 Nostalgia
2013-02-22 The Mistake
2013-03-01 Alana
2013-03-15 250th
2013-03-22 The Game
2013-03-29 The Future is Unwritten
2013-04-13 Legacy
2013-04-19 Appearances
2013-04-26 Discomfort
2013-05-10 It's All Been Done
2013-05-17 Tough Guys
2013-05-24 Sommelierize This: The Best of Season 9

Season 10 
2013-09-06 How to Age Gracefully
2013-09-13 Temporary Insanity
2013-09-20 Being Invisible
2013-10-03 The Sweetness of Youth
2013-10-10 Safe House
2013-10-18 The Other Life
2013-11-01 Small Change
2013-11-08 Apples vs. Oranges
2013-11-16 Trapped!
2013-11-29 Smoke and Mirrors
2013-12-06 This is What You Get
2013-12-20 Secret Santa
2014-01-10 The Liar
2014-01-17 The Very Last Minute
2014-01-24 Sanctuary
2014-02-07 A Hanky Full of Heart-Shaped Tears
2014-02-14 The Gold Rush
2014-02-21 A World Without Borders
2014-03-07 Other People's Problems
2014-03-14 Forgotten History
2014-03-21 What We Lose
2014-04-04 Spring Fever
2014-04-11 Re:birth
2014-04-18 A Face from the Past
2014-05-02 Milestones
2014-05-09 Life Vs. Art
2014-05-16 The Dilemna Dilemma
2014-05-23 I Can't Hear You, Eileen: The Best of Season 10

Season 11 
2014-09-05 The Power of Suggestion
2014-09-12 Old Wounds
2014-09-19 Double Power
2014-10-03 Final Words
2014-10-09 Against the Grain
2014-10-24 Halloween 2014: Axing for Trouble
2014-10-31 Shush
2014-11-07 This Magic Moment
2014-11-14 Sorry
2014-11-28 The Hail Mary Pass
2014-12-05 The Time Machine
2014-12-12 Five Goldstein Rings
2015-01-09 Dreamers
2015-01-16 The Ideal Self
2015-01-23 Just Dance
2015-02-06 What's The Use?
2015-02-13 The Dating Game
2015-02-20 All in Your Head
2015-03-06 Watch Your Language
2015-03-13 Yes or No
2015-03-20 Why is Mason Reese Crying?
2015-04-03 My Old Address Book
2015-04-10 Character Study
2015-04-24 There's A Light That Never Goes Out
2015-05-01 Bad Thoughts
2015-05-08 What We Really Mean
2015-05-22 How to Deal With Loss
2015-05-29 The Back Half Of The Moose: The Best Of Season 11

References

External links
 (as archived by Internet Archive Wayback Machine, May 2, 2015)

CBC Radio programs
Lists of radio series episodes